John Reginald Yorke (25 January 1836 – 2 March 1912) was an English landowner and Conservative politician who sat in the House of Commons between 1864 and 1886.

Background and education
A member of the Yorke family headed by the Earl of Hardwicke, he was born in Marylebone, London, the son of Joseph Yorke, of Forthampton Court, Gloucestershire and his wife Frances Antonia, daughter of Reginald Pole-Carew. He was educated at Eton and Balliol College, Oxford.  Yorke was a second cousin of Charles Lyttleton, 5th Baron Lyttleton, whose mother dowager Lady Lyttelton  referred to Yorke as "tall and magnificent and promising as ever".

Political career
Yorke was elected Member of Parliament (MP) for Tewkesbury in 1864 but in 1868 representation for the seat was reduced to one member. He was elected MP for East Gloucestershire between 1872 and held the seat until it was abolished in 1885. He was then elected M.P.  for Tewkesbury again in 1885 until 1886. He was a Justice of the Peace for Gloucestershire and Worcestershire, and in 1892 he was High Sheriff of Gloucestershire. He was also a Deputy Lieutenant of Worcestershire and captain in the Tewkesbury Rifle Volunteers. He was also a Fellow of the Geological Society. Yorke died at the age of 76.

Family
Yorke married Augusta Emmiline Monteath Douglas at St Georges Hanover Square on 4 March 1862. They had a son but Augusta died on 19 February 1863. He married, secondly, to Sophia Matilda de Tuyll de Serooskerken, daughter of Baron Vincent de Tuyll de Serooskerken, on 11 January 1868 and they had four children. His son Vincent Wodehouse Yorke was the father of Henry Vincent Yorke, better known as the novelist Henry Green. Another son, Ralph Maximilian Yorke, reached the rank of brigadier-general during the First World War.

References

External links 
 

1836 births
1912 deaths
People educated at Eton College
Conservative Party (UK) MPs for English constituencies
UK MPs 1859–1865
UK MPs 1865–1868
UK MPs 1868–1874
UK MPs 1874–1880
UK MPs 1880–1885
UK MPs 1885–1886
Alumni of Balliol College, Oxford
John
High Sheriffs of Gloucestershire
Deputy Lieutenants of Worcestershire
English landowners
19th-century British businesspeople